The Polish community in Pakistan comprises Pakistani citizens of Polish ancestry as well with Poles who migrated to and reside in Pakistan.

History
During World War II, from August 24, 1942, to December 31, 1944, around 28,000 Polish refugees migrated to Karachi, then part of the British Raj. About 58 Polish graves exist in the Christian Gora Qabaristan graveyard of Karachi. In memory of the 58 Polish citizens who died in Karachi in the 1940s, a memorial has been erected by the Polish government. It lists the names of all 58 individuals.

Most of the current migrants came to the country after its independence in 1947. The Pakistan Air Force employed some 30 Polish pilots to help develop it in the initial years with three year contracts.

Notable Pakistani citizens of Polish descent 
 Władysław Turowicz - One of several Polish pilots to relocate to Pakistan after World War II. He obtained Pakistani citizenship and became an Air Force officer as well as a space scientist at SUPARCO.
 Anna Molka Ahmed - artist and professor of fine arts
 Ilona Yusuf - poet

See also
 Polish civilian camps in World War II
 Murder of Piotr Stańczak
 Pakistan–Poland relations

References

 
 
Pakistan
Immigration to Pakistan
Polish diaspora in Asia